Klaas is a Dutch male given and surname. It is the Dutch short form of Nicholas, a Greek name ultimately meaning victory of the people. A traditionally common name in the Netherlands, its popularity declined some 20-fold since 1950. Archaic spellings include Claas and Claes. Among its female derivatives are Klaasje, Clasien, Clasina, Clasine, Clazien, Klasien, Klasina and Klaziena. Klaas also exists as a patronymic surname, though the forms Klaasen, Klaassen, Claassen, Claessen, and Claessens are more common.

Notable persons whose given name is Klaas
Klaas (fl. 1780), Khoikhoi guide to the explorer François Le Vaillant, who named Klaas's cuckoo after him
Klaas Afrikaner (fl. 1760–1800), Nama captain of the Orlam Afrikaners
Klaas Annink (1710–1775), Dutch serial killer
Klaas Bakker (1926–2016), Dutch footballer
Klaas Balk (born 1948), Dutch cyclist
Klaas van Berkel (born 1953), Dutch historian of science
Klaas de Boer (born 1942), Dutch-born American soccer player
Klaas Bolt (1927–1990), Dutch organist and improviser
Klaas Bom (born 1937), Dutch engineer
Klaas Breeuwer (1901–1961), Dutch footballer
Klaas van den Broek (born 1955), Dutch ice hockey player
Klaas Bruinsma (born 1931), Dutch translator to West Frisian
Klaas Bruinsma (1953–1991), Dutch drug baron
Klaas Buchly (1910–1965), Dutch cyclist
Klaas Carel Faber (1922–2012), Dutch WWII war criminal
Klaas Dijkhoff (born 1981), Dutch politician and legal scholar
Klaas Gerling (born 1981), German DJ known as "Klaas"
Klaas de Groot (born 1940), Dutch bioengineer
Klaas Gubbels (born 1934), Dutch painter and sculptor
Klaas Hendrikse (born 1947), Dutch atheist pastor
Klaas Heufer-Umlauf (born 1983), German television host
Klaas van der Horst (1731–1825), Dutch Mennonite teacher and minister
Klaas-Jan Huntelaar (born 1983), Dutch footballer
Klaas Knot (born 1967), Dutch economist and central banker
Klaas Kruik (1678–1754), Dutch cartographer and meteorologist better known as Cruquius
Klaas Lodewyck (born 1988), Belgian cyclist
Klaas van der Meulen (1642–1693), Dutch glass painter
 (1930–2008), Dutch organist, pianist, and conductor
 (1899–1986), Dutch racing cyclist
Klaas-Jan van Noortwijk (born 1970), Dutch cricketer
Klaas Nuninga (born 1940), Dutch footballer
Klaas Ooms (1917–1970), Dutch footballer
Klaas Jan Pen (1874–1932), Dutch sports shooter
Klaas Plantinga (1846–1922), Dutch distiller
Klaas Reimer (1770–1837), Prussian mennonite
Klaas Runia (1926–2006), Dutch theologian and journalist
Klaas Rusticus (born 1942),  Dutch author and television and film director
Klaas Schilder (1890–1952), Dutch theologian and professor
Klaas Smit (1930–2008), Dutch footballer
Klaas Sybrandi (1807–1872), Dutch Mennonite minister
Klaas Sys (born 1986), Belgian cyclists
Klaas Twisk (1930–1999), Dutch racing driver
Klaas Vantornout (born 1982), Belgian cyclist
Klaas Veenhof (born c. 1936), Dutch Assyriologist
Klaas Veering (born 1981), Dutch field hockey goalkeeper
Klaas Vermeulen (born 1988), Dutch field hockey player
Klaas de Vries (disambiguation), multiple people
Klaas de Waard, alias of Aart Alblas (1918–1944), Dutch navy officer and resistance member
 (1917–1993), Dutch legal scholar and politician
Klaas Woldendorp (1871–1936), Dutch sports shooter
Klaas-Erik Zwering (born 1981), Dutch swimmer and an Olympic medalist

Claas
Claas Epp, Jr. (1838–1913), Russian Mennonite minister
Claas Hugo Humbert (1830–1904), German scientist and writer

Fiction
Klaas Vaak is the traditional Dutch name for the Sandman

Notable persons whose surname is Klaas
C. J. Klaas (born 1983), American soccer defensive midfielder
Kathrin Klaas (born 1984), German hammer thrower
Masabata Klaas (born 1991), South African cricketer
Polly Klaas (1981–1993), American murder victim
Urmas Klaas (born 1971), is Estonian politician 
Werner Klaas (1914–1945), German footballer

See also
Claus / Klaus, German forms of Klaas
Nicholas
 Klaas's cuckoo (Chrysococcyx klaas), named after Klaas, a Khoikhoi man who found the type specimen
Klaas Smits River in Eastern Cape, South Africa

References

Masculine given names
Dutch masculine given names

nds:Klaas
nl:Klaas